Sidney "Sid" Rix (third ¼ 1898 – death unknown) was an English professional rugby league footballer who played in the 1910s, 1920s and 1930s.

Background
Sid Rix was born in Irlam o'the Heights, Lancashire, England, his birth was registered in Salford, Lancashire, England.

Playing career

International honours
Rix won caps for England while at Oldham in 1924 against Other Nationalities, in 1925 against Wales, in 1926 against Wales, and Other Nationalities, and won caps for Great Britain while at Oldham in 1924 against Australia (3 matches), New Zealand (3 matches), and in 1926–27 against New Zealand (3 matches).

County League appearances
About Sid Rix's time there was Oldham's victory in the Lancashire County League during the 1921–22 season.

Challenge Cup Final appearances
Sidney Rix played , i.e. number 2, in Oldham's 4–21 defeat by Wigan in the 1924 Challenge Cup Final during the 1923–24 season at Athletic Grounds, Rochdale on Saturday 12 April 1924. About Sidney Rix's time, there was Oldham's 16–3 victory over Hull Kingston Rovers in the 1925 Challenge Cup Final during the 1924–25 season at Headingley Rugby Stadium, the 3–9 defeat by Swinton in the 1926 Challenge Cup Final during the 1925–26 season at Athletic Grounds, Rochdale, and the 26–7 victory over Swinton in the 1927 Challenge Cup Final during the 1926–27 season at Central Park, Wigan.

County Cup Final appearances
About Sid Rix's time, there was Oldham's 5–7 defeat by Warrington in the 1921 Lancashire County Cup Final during the 1921–22 season at The Cliff, Broughton, Salford on Saturday 3 December 1921, and played left-, i.e. number 4, in the 10–0 victory over St Helens Recs in the 1924 Lancashire County Cup Final during the 1924–25 season at The Willows, Salford on Saturday 22 November 1924.

References

External links
Statistics at orl-heritagetrust.org.uk
Search for "Sidney Rix" at britishnewspaperarchive.co.uk
Search for "Sid Rix" at britishnewspaperarchive.co.uk

1898 births
England national rugby league team players
English rugby league players
Great Britain national rugby league team players
Oldham R.L.F.C. players
Place of death missing
Rugby league centres
Rugby league players from Salford
Rugby league wingers
Year of death missing